Los Banos High School (pronounced "Loss-Ban-ohse") is a high school located in Los Banos, California, United States, in Merced County.  Its sports programs play in the Western Athletic Conference.

Notable alumni 
Susan Atkins, member of the Manson Family
Maude Apatow, cast member on euphoria

References

High schools in Merced County, California
Los Banos, California
Public high schools in California
1964 establishments in California